Hoon Thien How (born 24 December 1986) is a former badminton player from Malaysia who plays in the men's doubles category. Currently, he is one of the assistant coach for Malaysia men's doubles national team.

Career 
Hoon Thien How and Tan Boon Heong were the World Junior Champions in 2004. Their partnership continued until early 2006 when they won the silver medal at the 2006 Asian Badminton Championships. Shortly after, Tan was partnered with Koo Kien Keat and Hoon was briefly partnered with Chan Chong Ming and then, Ong Soon Hock.

Hoon and Ong participated in the 2008 Indonesia Open and reached the semi-finals before being beaten by Candra Wijaya and Tony Gunawan, 25–23, 15–21, 15–21. This was followed by a defeat to second-seeded Cai Yun/Fu Haifeng in the 2008 China Masters 15–21, 21–17, and 20–22.

In 2010, Hoon and Ong were chosen to play for Malaysia Thomas Cup squad. From 2010 onward, he was paired with Tan Wee Kiong. Hoon and Tan broke into the top 10 in the world rankings on 20 December 2012. Together, their highest ranking was at No. 7. Hoon and Tan did not win any Super Series tournaments during their partnership. However, they often made it to the quarterfinals, semifinals or finals of the tournaments which contributed to their world ranking.

In May 2014, Hoon represented Malaysia at 2014 Thomas Cup with former partner, Tan Boon Heong as a scratch pair. They played first doubles and defeated World No. 1 pair, Mohammad Ahsan and Hendra Setiawan of Indonesia in the semi finals but failed to defeat world No. 3 pair, Hiroyuki Endo and Kenichi Hayakawa of Japan in the finals. Malaysia lost narrowly 2–3 to Japan.

After 8 years since they last played together as official partners, Hoon's partnership with Tan Boon Heong was permanently resumed in September 2014. This was due to the resignation of Boon Heong's partner, Koo Kien Keat earlier that year along with Tan Wee Kiong's new partnership with Goh V Shem.

Achievements

Asian Championships 
Men's Doubles

World Junior Championships 
Boys' Doubles

BWF Superseries 
The BWF Superseries has two level such as Superseries and Superseries Premier. A season of Superseries features twelve tournaments around the world, which introduced since 2011, with successful players invited to the Superseries Finals held at the year end.

Men's Doubles

 Superseries Finals Tournament
 Superseries Premier Tournament
 Superseries Tournament

BWF Grand Prix 
The BWF Grand Prix has two levels: Grand Prix and Grand Prix Gold. It is a series of badminton tournaments, sanctioned by Badminton World Federation (BWF) since 2007.

Men's Doubles

 BWF Grand Prix Gold tournament
 BWF Grand Prix tournament

References

External links

 Profile at Badminton Association of Malaysia

1986 births
Living people
Sportspeople from Kuala Lumpur
Malaysian people of Hokkien descent
Malaysian people of Chinese descent
Malaysian sportspeople of Chinese descent
Malaysian male badminton players
Asian Games medalists in badminton
Badminton players at the 2014 Asian Games
Asian Games bronze medalists for Malaysia
Medalists at the 2014 Asian Games